Maharashtra Institute of Medical Sciences & Research Latur,  is a medical institution located in Latur, Maharashtra, India. It is affiliated to the Maharashtra University of Health Sciences and recognised by the Medical Council of India. It was established in 1989 and principally offers a graduate degree in medicine namely MBBS (Bachelor of Medicine Bachelor of Surgery). It has a total student intake capacity of 150. Postgraduate courses are not offered.

The division of seats for students from the state of Maharashtra & Rest of India is as follows:
Students from MHTCET(Maharashtra Health Sciences Common Entrance test): 85%
Students from PMT(All India Pre Medical Test): 15%

The detailed division of seats can be seen on the Maharashtra University of Health Sciences website and is subject to change.

The college campus is located on the outskirts of the Latur city. The Hospital attached to the college is Yeshwantrao Chavan Rural Hospital, Latur.

References

External links
Maharshtra University of Health Sciences
MIMSRL Official Website

Medical colleges in Maharashtra
Education in Latur
Educational institutions established in 1989
1989 establishments in Maharashtra